The Order of Belize is the second highest honour awarded to foreigners in Belize by the government of Belize.  It was instituted on 16 August 1991.

Recipients 
 Felipe Calderón
 Fidel Castro
 Vicente Fox
 Philip Goldson
 Ma Ying-jeou
 Letizia Moratti
 Carlos Salinas de Gortari
 Curl Thompson
Tsai Ing-wen

References

Orders, decorations, and medals of Belize
1991 establishments in Belize
Orders of chivalry awarded to heads of state, consorts and sovereign family members
Awards established in 1991